"Between the Bars" is the fourth track of Elliott Smith's 1997 album Either/Or. It is written as a short ballad in the key of G Minor. Possibly Smith's most popular song, it is one of three tracks from Either/Or that was used in the soundtrack of Good Will Hunting (1997). It is also featured in the 2012 indie film Stuck in Love and in the seventh episode of season two of Rick and Morty. A cover version of the song performed by Chris Garneau was used in Pedro Almodovar's film La piel que habito (The skin I live in) in 2012.

Reception
Pitchfork said the song, "conceals its desperate melancholy within a lilting melody that never stops moving forward. Like all of the late songwriter's best songs, this one contains layers; what seems at first like a comforting lullaby to a troubled lover reveals itself, on repeated listens, to describe the seductive promise of alcoholism. "

Cover versions
"Between the Bars" has been covered by artists such as Metric, Chris Garneau, Madeleine Peyroux, Glen Phillips, Madonna, Marika Hackman, Kevin Devine, Poppy, The Civil Wars, Agnes Obel, Beabadoobee, Charlotte Cardin, Tanya Donelly, and Seth Avett/Jessica Lea Mayfield.

References

1990s ballads
1997 songs
Elliott Smith songs
Folk ballads
Songs about alcohol
Songs written by Elliott Smith